The Netherlands cricket team toured Qatar in January 2022 to play three One Day International (ODI) matches against Afghanistan. The ODI series formed part of the inaugural 2020–2023 ICC Cricket World Cup Super League. All three matches were played at the West End Park International Cricket Stadium in Doha. Prior to the series, Hashmatullah Shahidi was named as Afghanistan's ODI captain, after he had been named as Asghar Afghan's replacement.

Afghanistan won the first ODI by 36 runs. With a century from Rahmanullah Gurbaz, Afghanistan won the second ODI by 48 runs to win the series with a match to play. In the third and final ODI, Afghanistan won by 75 runs, to take the series 3–0.

Following the series, Dutch bowler Vivian Kingma was found guilty of ball tampering, and was given a four-match ban.

Squads

On 12 January 2022, Musa Ahmed was added to the Dutch squad as a replacement for Max O'Dowd. Mohammad Nabi ruled himself out of Afghanistan's squad to allow younger players a chance to represent the team.

ODI series

1st ODI

2nd ODI

3rd ODI

References

External links
 Series home at ESPN Cricinfo

2022 in Afghan cricket
2022 in Dutch cricket
International cricket competitions in 2021–22